The 1968 Football Cup of Ukrainian SSR among KFK  was the annual season of Ukraine's football knockout competition for amateur football teams.

Competition schedule

Preliminary round

|}
Notes:

First qualification round

|}
Notes:

Second qualification round

{{OneLegResult|FC Bilshovyk Kyiv|| x–x |?}}

|}Notes:'''

Quarterfinals (1/4)

|}

Semifinals (1/2)

|}

Final

|}

See also
 1968 KFK competitions (Ukraine)

External links
 1968. regional-football.ru
 Кубок Украины среди любителей 1968. footballfacts.ru

Ukrainian Amateur Cup
Ukrainian Amateur Cup
Amateur Cup